"Wash My World" is a 2008 song recorded by French DJ Laurent Wolf, and performed by Éric Carter. It was the second single from his album of the same name on which it features as second track, and was released on August 22, 2008. It was successful in France and Belgium (Wallonia) where it was a top ten hit, but was not able to reach the same success in terms of chart as the previous single, "No Stress". However, its sales in its first week were higher (6,072 sales), but the single was only #5, its peak position in France.

Track listings
 CD maxi
 "Wash My World" (Radio edit) — 3:21
 "Wash My World" (Monsieur Elle remix) — 7:04
 "Wash My World" (Dim Chris remix) — 8:20
 "No Stress" (Laurent Wolf vs Big Ali and DJ Snake) — 3:10

 Digital download
 "Wash My World" (Radio edit) — 3:21
 "Wash My World" (Monsieur Elle remix) — 7:04
 "Wash My World" (Dim Chris remix) — 8:20

Charts

Weekly charts

Year-end charts

References

2008 singles
Laurent Wolf songs
2008 songs
Columbia Records singles